Ivan Dimov was a Bulgarian actor. He finished the acting school at the Ivan Vazov National Theatre and spent the next 39 years playing on the stage. Meanwhile he managed to star in some of the most prominent Bulgarian films of the 1950s and 1960s like "Kalin Orelat" and "Tyutyun". For his contribution to the cinema Dimov was awarded the title People's artist (very popular in the People's Republic of Bulgaria).

Full filmography

 Tyutyun (1962) as Barutchiev
 Tzarska milost (1962) as Doychin Radionov
 Komandirat na otryada (1959) as Bay Nikola
 Malkata (1959) as Yatakat
 Siromashka radost (1958) as Dyado Mateyko
 Geratzite (1958) as Margalaka
 Dimitrovgradtsy (1956) as Enev
 Pod igoto (1952) as Marin vaglishtarya
 Kalin orela''' (1950) as Kalin
 Izpitanie (1942) as Alexander Kamenov, eng.
 Strahil voyvoda (1938) as Strahil voyvoda
 Bezkrustni grobove'' (1931) as Kocho

References

External link

1897 births
1965 deaths
Bulgarian male film actors
People from Chirpan